Rockdale Plaza is a shopping centre located in the suburb of Rockdale in the St George area of Sydney.

Transport 
The Eastern Suburbs and Illawarra Line offer frequent services to Rockdale station. 

Rockdale Plaza has bus connections to St George and Sutherland Shire, as well as local surrounding suburbs. It is served by Punchbowl Bus Company, Transit Systems NSW and Transdev NSW services. Majority of its bus services located on Princes Highway and Rockdale Plaza Drive.

Rockdale Plaza has multi level car parks with 875 spaces.

History
The original shopping centre known as Southside Plaza opened on 15 August 1963 by Rockdale MP Brian Bannon and was built over former market gardens with tonnes of soil had to be brought in to raise the ground level to the height of the Princes Highway. 

Southside Plaza featured a Mark Foy's, Woolworths Food Fair (rebranded to Flemings in the 1980s and rebranded to Woolworths later), Franklins, AMF Bowling Alley and 33 stores. The bowling alley remained separate from the centre despite proposals to join them. Since its opening in 1963 led the way in the retail revolution, which swept through southern Sydney in the 1960s. Southside Plaza also held the trash and treasure market on Sundays. 

In 1967 Mark Foys was extensively damaged by fire. It was then rebuilt and became a McDowells store and then was rebranded as Waltons in 1972. In 1978 Waltons relocated to the newly built Westfield Hurstville and the space became vacant since.

The opening of Roselands and the redeveloped Miranda Fair had been blamed for a downturn in trade at Southside Plaza and various redevelopment proposals were proposed but never eventuated. In the 1992 Southside Plaza was demolished and construction started on redeveloping the site. 

Rockdale Plaza opened on 29 October 1997 and featured Big W, Franklins, Woolworths and over 50 specialty stores. Bowlers were informed that the Tenpin Bowling Alley would be incorporated into the new centre however it did not eventuate. In 2013, Franklins closed its store and was split in half, one half was taken up by Best & Less as well as Aldi which opened on the other half on 16 October 2013. Best & Less closed in July 2020 and Chemist Warehouse moved into its space, the original space of Chemist Warehouse is currently being refurbished into a new store. 

In April 2019, Rockdale Plaza was purchased by Charter Hall for $142 million.

Tenants
Rockdale Plaza has 35,945 of floor space. The major retailers include Big W, Aldi, Woolworths and Rebel.

References

External links
Rockdale Plaza Official Website

Shopping centres in Sydney
Shopping malls established in 1997
1997 establishments in Australia